Arthur Patrick Hastings Forbes, 9th Earl of Granard AFC (10 April 1915 – 21 November 1992), was a British peer.

Early life
Born on 10 April 1915, He was the son of Bernard Forbes, 8th Earl of Granard (1874–1948) and Beatrice (née Mills) Forbes, Countess of Granard (1883–1972), an American socialite who was the daughter of Ogden Mills and a descendant of the Livingston family and the Schuyler family from New York. He had one younger brother, the Hon. John Forbes, and two sisters, Eileen, Lady Bute of Scotland, and Moira, Countess Rossi of Switzerland.

He was educated at Eton and Trinity College, Cambridge. He received a BA from Cambridge University in 1937.

Career
Early in the Second World War, on 31 October 1939, he was appointed Air Attaché to Romania, being given the rank of Wing Commander. He used his own aircraft, a Percival Q6, to fly, often secretly, British subjects and other diplomats who had escaped from Poland during the German invasion from Cernăuți in Northern Romania (now Chernivtsi in Ukraine) to Bucharest and on to Greece or Turkey. On 30 October 1940, he was appointed deputy Air Attaché to Greece. Later in the war, he acted as an adviser to the Minister of State for the Middle East. After the war, he was appointed Air Attaché to France. His decorations included the British Air Force Cross, the French Legion of Honor and the American Legion of Merit.

From 1972 to 1990, he was a director of Texaco.  Lord Granard also served as a director for other companies, including the Nabisco Group Ltd. and Martini & Rossi.

Personal life

Lord Granard was married to Marie-Madeleine Eugenie, Princess of Faucigny Lucinge, (d. 1990).  Marie was the daughter of Jean Maurel and the first wife of Prince Humbert de Faucigny-Lucinge (a brother of Prince de Cystria, both descendants of Louis IX of France). Together, Marie and Lord Granard lived at Castleforbes demesne, the largest estate in County Longford, were the parents of two children:

 Lady Moira Forbes (b. 1951), who married Prince Charles-Antoine Lamoral of Ligne-La Trémoïlle, son of Prince Jean Charles Lamoral of Ligne-La Trémoïlle in February 1971. They divorced in 1975 and she married, secondly, José de Guerrico Casado-Sastre in 1978.
 Lady Georgina Forbes (b. 1952), an owner of international showjumping horses.

The Earl of Granard died at his home in Morges, Switzerland in 1992 at age seventy-seven. As he had no sons, his nephew Peter inherited the title and continues to be the holder.

References

External links

1915 births
1992 deaths
People educated at Eton College
British people of American descent
British people of Dutch descent
Recipients of the Legion of Honour
Foreign recipients of the Legion of Merit
Recipients of the Air Force Cross (United Kingdom)
Royal Air Force personnel of World War II
Alumni of Trinity College, Cambridge
British Roman Catholics
Livingston family
Schuyler family
Earls of Granard